HMS Bedham was one of 93 ships of the  of inshore minesweepers.

Their names were all chosen from villages ending in -ham. The minesweeper was named after Bedham in West Sussex.

Further reading

References

Ham-class minesweepers
Ships built in England
1953 ships
Cold War minesweepers of the United Kingdom
Royal Navy ship names
Ham-class minesweepers of the Royal Malaysian Navy